Steven John Baker (born 6 June 1971) is a British politician serving as Minister of State for Northern Ireland since 2022. He is a former Royal Air Force engineer, consultant and bank worker, who was chair of the European Research Group (ERG) from 2016 to 2017 and 2019 to 2020. A member of the Conservative Party, he has been the Member of Parliament (MP) for Wycombe in Buckinghamshire since 2010.

In June 2015 he became co-chair of Conservatives for Britain, a campaigning organisation formed of Eurosceptic MPs. He co-founded The Cobden Centre and sits on its advisory board. He established and chairs the all-party parliamentary group (APPG) on Economics, Money and Banking. He was chair of the ERG, a pro-Brexit group of Conservative MPs, from 20 November 2016 until his promotion to ministerial office at the Department for Exiting the European Union on 13 June 2017, but resigned from his office on 9 July 2018 following the resignation of David Davis over concerns with the government's strategy on Brexit. The same day Jacob Rees-Mogg appointed Baker as the deputy chair and de facto whip of the ERG, alongside Mark Francois. In September 2019 Baker was again elected as the group's chair, taking over from Rees-Mogg. In February 2020 he announced his resignation from the post, but confirmed that he would continue as a member.
In late 2021, Baker announced the campaign group Conservative Way Forward will be relaunched in 2022
with him as its new chairman.

Early life and career
Baker was born on 6 June 1971 in St Austell in Cornwall, one of nine children. He was educated at Poltair School in St Austell and St Austell Sixth Form College followed by the University of Southampton where he gained a BEng in Aerospace Engineering. He later studied at St Cross College, Oxford, where he earned an MSc in Computation.

On 3 September 1989, Baker joined the Royal Air Force as an engineer and became an Engineering Officer, with the rank of pilot officer, on 15 July 1992. He was promoted to flying officer in 1993 and flight lieutenant in 1996. Remaining in that latter rank, Baker retired from the RAF on 1 August 1999 at his own request. He later worked as a consulting software engineer and manager. He was head of client services with DecisionSoft Ltd (now named CoreFiling) in Oxford from 2000 to 2001.

Baker has worked as a Unix system administrator. He was appointed as Chief Technical Officer at BASDA Ltd, Great Missenden in 2002, a position he held until 2007. For a year from 2005 he was director of product development at CoreFiling Ltd. He was the chief architect of global financing and asset service platforms at Lehman Brothers from 2006 to 2008. He has been principal of Ambriel Consulting Ltd since 2001. He is a founding member of The Cobden Centre, an educational charity promoting Austrian economics.

Parliamentary career
Baker was selected as the Conservative candidate for Wycombe on 31 October 2009, after former Conservative MP Paul Goodman stood down; it was the first seat for which Baker had sought selection. Baker held the seat for the Conservative Party. He received 23,423 votes – a vote share of 48.6%, higher than Goodman's 42.4% and 45.8% in the 2001 and 2005 general elections respectively. He was re-elected at the 2015 general election and 2017 general election. The 2017 election saw Baker's majority cut to just 6,500, with Labour gaining 37.7% of the vote. Wycombe is now listed as a marginal, and despite it being number 43 on Labour's list of target seats requiring a 6.15% swing for Labour to win, Baker held onto the seat in the 2019 general election with a reduced majority.

Baker was rated as one of the Conservatives' top 10 most rebellious MPs of the 2010 intake. He was nominated as a 'Newcomer of the Year' on ConservativeHome. He was named as the most authoritative Member of Parliament on Twitter in January 2011. In March 2011, Baker initiated an adjournment debate alleging a malicious prosecution of an operator of an independent mental health unit. Eventually, the Solicitor General Edward Garnier issued an apology. That year, Baker attracted controversy after he was one of three Conservative MPs who went on a luxury trip to Equatorial Guinea, funded by the Government of the state, via a trust based in Malta. They reported at the end of the trip that human rights violations in the country were "trivial", in contrast to Amnesty International, which had reported repeated incidents of torture in the country.

Baker has campaigned for banking reform, calling for banks to re-adopt Generally Accepted Accounting Practice to account for devalued loans, as well as failed ones; in May 2011, he calculated that the use of IFRS instead of GAAP over-stated the strength of Royal Bank of Scotland's balance sheet by £25bn. He introduced a Ten Minute Rule bill to 'bring casino banking into the light', by changing rules by which banks account for derivatives. He was elected to the executive of the 1922 Committee on 16 May 2012, saying he was 'fed up with factionalism' and wanted 'to stand as neither a modernising 301 candidate or a traditionalist'.

Baker was shortlisted for the Grassroot Diplomat Initiative Award in 2015 for the founding of the Cobden Centre, and remains in the directory of the Grassroot Diplomat Who's Who publication. In 2017, the Unite Union raised concerns that Baker had lobbied for the deregulation of white asbestos. In 2010, in a series of parliamentary questions, Baker asked the Work and Pensions Secretary: "If he will bring forward proposals to distinguish the white form of asbestos and the blue and brown forms of that substance", also questioning: "If he will commission an inquiry into the appropriateness of the health and safety precautions in force in respect of asbestos cement."

In February 2018, as a minister in the Department for Exiting the European Union he was forced to apologise after inaccurately claiming that civil servants had deliberately produced negative economic models to influence policy. Answering questions in the House of Commons, Baker confirmed a claim by the Eurosceptic backbencher Jacob Rees-Mogg that Charles Grant, the Director of the Centre for European Reform, had reported that Treasury officials "had deliberately developed a model to show that all options other than staying in the customs union were bad, and that officials intended to use this to influence policy". Audio then emerged of the event in question, which showed that Grant had not made the comments attributed to him. By the time the audio was released by Prospect magazine, the Prime Minister's spokesman had already backed Baker's claims. The spokesman later said that Baker had made a "genuine mistake". On 8 July 2018, Baker resigned following the resignation of the Brexit Secretary, David Davis after working on a Brexit white paper which Baker said "did not accord with what was put to the cabinet" a few days earlier.

On 22 October 2018, Baker submitted a letter of no confidence in Theresa May's leadership over her Brexit Withdrawal Agreement proposals, stating that he had become convinced it was not possible to "separate the person from the policy." A few days earlier, Baker had told fellow members of the European Research Group that by his count they likely already had the 48 letters necessary to trigger a motion of no confidence in Theresa May's leadership, and told BBC Politics they were "pretty close" to getting them "with a dozen more probables on top".

In the House of Commons Baker has sat on the Transport Committee and the Treasury Committee.

Baker is a council member of the Air League.

In May 2020 he called for Dominic Cummings's resignation. He is a steering committee member of the COVID Recovery Group, a group of Conservative MPs who opposed the UK government's December 2020 lockdown. The Telegraph described them as being seen by Westminster as an "echo" of the Brexiteer European Research Group (ERG), and a response by backbench Conservatives to Nigel Farage's anti-lockdown Reform UK party.

In April 2022, in the wake of the Partygate scandal surrounding British Prime Minister Boris Johnson, Baker stated in the House of Commons that "the gig is up" and that Johnson should be "long gone by now". He said this two days after he had praised the prime minister's new apology given that week for his actions during the period of behaviour restrictions imposed over the COVID pandemic.

On 7 September 2022, he was appointed Minister of State in the Northern Ireland Office as part of Liz Truss’s administration. The appointment comes at a sensitive time with the government facing challenges over the Northern Ireland Protocol.

Political positions
Some commentators, such as Ian Birrell of The Guardian, regard Baker as being on the right wing of the Conservative Party. The Associated Press has described him as a libertarian. He is a member of the socially conservative Cornerstone Group. He describes his political inspiration as being the Liberal Richard Cobden, founding the Cobden Centre under the motto: 'Peace will come to earth when the people have more to do with each other and governments less'. He identifies as a born again Christian.

Climate change 
Baker has expressed scepticism about the exact scope of human influence on climate change, stating in 2010 that the science appears to be subject to uncertainties and that bad economics are a greater threat to civilisation than climate change. In 2022, he shared a paper on social media which denied climate change. He was a trustee of the Global Warming Policy Foundation from May 2021 to September 2022, an organisation which has historically breached Charity Commission rules on impartiality in its climate change coverage. At an event hosted in parliament in July 2022, by the GWPF, Baker accused climate campaigners of “terrifying children” and said he regarded their warnings as “child abuse.”

DeSmog, the climate science fact checking website, has documented the extensive ties between the GWPF and Baker’s Net Zero Scrutiny Group of MPs opposed to the UK’s climate goals. 

Baker has said he would end incentives for wind and solar power because "they are fundamentally intermittent sources of energy", and instead would encourage domestic production of natural gas. He said many green measures including farmers' support payments were "anti-human life on Earth in the name of environmentalism", and would encourage maximising food production.

Baker voted against the party whip to oppose the construction of the High Speed 2 rail line in 2010, although the line did not pass through his own constituency, arguing that the whole plan should be scrapped.

Brexit 
Baker campaigned for Brexit before and during the 2016 referendum. He says he originally joined the Conservative Party with the express intention of campaigning for the UK to leave the EU. He chaired Conservatives for Britain, a predecessor group to the official Vote Leave campaign and the Eurosceptic European Research Group until becoming a minister. He was described by the New Statesman as someone who had been "the most doctrinaire Leaver inside government and one of the few sincere advocates for a no-deal exit on the government payroll" before resigning. Back in 2010, he stated at a meeting of the Libertarian Alliance that he thought "the European Union needs to be wholly torn down", considering it "an obstacle to ... free trade and peace among all the nations of Europe as well as the world". Baker argues Brexit presents an opportunity for more free trade outside the EU but also favours protectionism against China. During an interview with Sky News after a debate on Brexit in April 2019, Baker referred to himself as "the hard man of Brexit".

Economics 
Baker has advocated a return to the gold standard and identifies with the Austrian School of Economics. He opposed quantitative easing policies in 2011, arguing they would create a worse crisis.

Same-sex marriage 
Baker voted in opposition to the Marriage (Same Sex Couples) Act 2013, and called for the denationalisation of marriage. He argued that the current situation risks infringing both the freedoms of the religious and LGBT communities, and that private individuals should define the term marriage, rather than the state.

Parliament 
Regarding parliamentary procedures, Baker wants to reform early day motions (EDMs), possibly replacing them with "Members' Motions" on the grounds that EDMs 'are used to publicise the views of individual MPs', whereas a system such as 'Members' Motions' could be 'debated by the House'.

In February 2021, Baker proposed to reform the Public Health Act legislation to "prevent ministers [from] imposing job-destroying restrictions without warning or scrutiny" in light of the COVID-19 pandemic in the United Kingdom, to ensure that economists have a share of seats on the advisory board where "decisions on social restrictions are made", and drew inspiration for his proposed monthly sunset clauses from the Civil Contingencies Act.

Personal life 
Steve Baker is married to Beth (Julia Elizabeth), a former RAF officer in the medical branch whom he met on his first tour which was at RAF Leeming. He is a committed evangelical Christian and attends a local Baptist church. He lists skydiving and advanced motorcycling as his hobbies. An advanced driver, he has successfully passed the High Performance Course. ‌He is a Fellow of the Royal Society of Arts.

References

External links
 
 
 Steven Baker MP  Conservative Party profile
 Wycombe Conservatives

 

|-

|-

|-

1971 births
Living people
20th-century Royal Air Force personnel
Alumni of St Cross College, Oxford
Alumni of the University of Southampton
Austrian School economists
British evangelicals
British libertarians
Christian libertarians
Conservative Party (UK) MPs for English constituencies
Members of the Freedom Association
Right-wing populism in the United Kingdom
Royal Air Force officers
UK MPs 2010–2015
UK MPs 2015–2017
UK MPs 2017–2019
UK MPs 2019–present
British Eurosceptics
Free Enterprise Group
People from St Austell